Esthlogena albisetosa is a species of beetle in the family Cerambycidae. It was described by Henry Walter Bates in 1880. It is known from Honduras and Mexico.

References

Pteropliini
Beetles described in 1880